Uganda has competed in fifteen Commonwealth Games, from 1954.

Medallists

List of medallists

Overall medal tally
With 39 medals, Uganda ranked eighteenth as of 2008 in the all-time tally of medals.

References

External links
NOC Uganda

 
Nations at the Commonwealth Games